Martin Ingvarsson (born 9 December 1965) is a Swedish football former referee. Ingvarsson currently resides in Hässleholm.  He was a full international referee for FIFA between 1997 and 2010. He became a professional referee in 1984 and was an Allsvenskan referee between 1993 and 2011. Ingvarsson refereed 339 matches in Allsvenskan, 65 matches in Superettan and 94 international matches.

See also 

 List of football referees

References

External links 
FIFA
SvFF

1965 births
Living people
Swedish football referees